Art or Arthur Powell may refer to:

 Art Powell (wide receiver) (1937–2015), former American football wide receiver
 Art Powell (coach) (1884–1969), head coach of the Buffalo Bulls college basketball program, 1915–1943
 Arthur E. Powell (1882–1969), theosophist and author
 Arthur William Baden Powell (1901–1987), New Zealand malacologist, naturalist and palaeontologist
Spence Powell (1903–1970), Arthur Thomas (Spence) Powell
Peter Baden-Powell, 2nd Baron Baden-Powell (1913–1963), Arthur Robert Peter Baden-Powell
Baden Powell (politician) (1900–1955), Arthur Redvers Baden Powell

See also
Arthur Powell Davies